Machine Head is an American heavy metal band formed in 1991 by vocalist/guitarist Robb Flynn and bassist Adam Duce. They have released ten studio albums, two live albums, one extended play, one video album, and thirteen singles. Later that year, Logan Mader and Tony Costanza were hired as guitarist and drummer respectively. Costanza left the band shortly afterwards, being replaced by Chris Kontos. In 1993, they signed to Roadrunner Records and released their debut album, Burn My Eyes, in 1994. Their second album, The More Things Change..., was released in 1997.

In 1999, Machine Head released The Burning Red, with this album the band changed its musical direction and were accused of selling out. Despite backlash from the media, the album debuted at number 88 on the Billboard 200. In 2001, Machine Head released its fourth studio album, Supercharger. The music video for "Crashing Around You", taken from this album, was avoided by MTV after the September 11, 2001 attacks due to its depictions of falling buildings. After the music video ban, Roadrunner stopped promoting the album, causing the band to leave the label after the release of a live album, Hellalive, only for contract obligations.
The band's fifth studio album, Through the Ashes of Empires, was released in Europe and caught the attention of Roadrunner US. The label asked the band to re-sign to them and the band accepted. In March 2007, Machine Head released its sixth studio album, The Blackening, which debuted at number 54 on the Billboard 200, their highest chart position in the United States.

Albums

Studio albums

Live albums

Extended plays

Singles

Promotional singles

Videos

Video albums 

a.Refers to the Billboard Top Music Video chart.

Music videos 

b. The music video for "Fuck It All" was filmed prior to the recording of Burn My Eyes. It appeared on the album under the title of "Block".

References

Discographies of American artists
Heavy metal group discographies